James II is the second EP by James, released in February 1985 by Factory Records. It contains two tracks, which were later included on the EP Village Fire, along with the tracks from the band's debut release Jimone. It reached number 2 on the UK Independent Chart, staying on the chart for 18 weeks.

Track listing 
 "Hymn From A Village" – 2:48
 "If Things Were Perfect" – 3:03

Personnel
Tim Booth - Vocals
Jim Glennie - Bass guitar
Larry Gott - Lead guitar
Gavan Whelan - Drums

References

1985 EPs
Factory Records EPs
James (band) EPs